Morten B. Christoffersen (born 10 February 1968) is a Danish windsurfer. He competed at the 1992 Summer Olympics and the 1996 Summer Olympics.

References

External links
 
 

1968 births
Living people
Danish male sailors (sport)
Danish windsurfers
Olympic sailors of Denmark
Sailors at the 1992 Summer Olympics – Lechner A-390
Sailors at the 1996 Summer Olympics – Mistral One Design
People from Lyngby-Taarbæk Municipality
Sportspeople from the Capital Region of Denmark